The Best is a compilation double album of American guitarist Leo Kottke's releases on the Capitol label. The liner notes were written by Dr. Demento.

The Rhino box set release Anthology covers the first 15 years of Kottke's career and includes selections from the Takoma, Capitol, and Chrysalis releases along with extensive liner notes. Capitol later released another compilation package titled The Best of Leo Kottke. Chrysalis released Essential Leo Kottke covering Kottke's mid-career releases on that label. Blue Note Records also released two compilations, The Best of the Capitol Years and The Best of the Chrysalis Years on CD in 2003.

The Best was re-issued on CD by BGO (CD277) in 1996.

Reception 

In their 1996 review, Dirty Linen stated "...Combining equal parts acoustic, electric, live, and vocal material, the compilation is an ideal introduction for new listeners...",

In his Allmusic review, critic Thom Jurek called it "...the best one for the money. Sonically it is superior, using later-phase master technology, and its presentation is sleeker as well. The biggest asset here is that this collection does feature some of the more well-known vocal selections closely associated with the guitarist..."

Music critic Robert Christgau stated: "Much as I admire John Fahey, I'm no aficionado of the school of solo guitar he inspired, and though I once complained that Kottke lacked Fahey's "courage and clarity" I think what I really meant was genius—and I have no idea what that means. If a guest were to request Kottke I'd play Capitol's The Best twofer, which I enjoy under duress—the sides he doesn't sing on, that is."

Track listing
All songs by Leo Kottke except as noted.
The four original sides were labeled, in order, Acoustic, Electric, Live, and Singing
All songs taken from Mudlark, Greenhouse, Ice Water, My Feet are Smiling, Dreams and All That Stuff, and Chewing Pine
The 1996 CD release included two discs.

Side one
 "Machine No. 2" – 3:00
 "Cripple Creek" (Traditional) – 3:07
 "Bourée" (J. S. Bach)  – 1:26
 "When Shrimps Learn to Whistle" – 3:28
 "Bill Cheatham" (Traditional) – 1:45
 "The Song of the Swamp" – 3:00
 "Last Steam Engine Train" (John Fahey) – 3:02

Side two
 "Bean Time" – 2:32
 "The Spanish Entomologist" – 2:19
 "Short Stories" (Leo Kottke, Cal Hand) – 3:01
 "Hole in the Day" – 2:50
 "Mona Roy" – 1:48
 "Venezuela, There You Go" – 3:08
 "Monkey Lust" (Kottke, Fowley) – 1:48

Side three
 "Busted Bicycle" – 2:37
 "June Bug" – 2:06
 "Eggtooth" (Kottke, Johnson) – 5:15
 "Stealing" – 1:34
 "Living in the Country" (Pete Seeger) – 1:36
 Medley "Crow River Waltz" / "Jesu, Joy of Man's Desiring" (J. S. Bach) / "Jack Fig" – 7:20

Side four
 "Standing in My Shoes" (Kottke, Bruce) – 4:01
 "Bumblebee" – 3:39
 "Eight Miles High" (Roger McGuinn, David Crosby, Gene Clark) – 3:33
 "Tilt Billings and the Student Prince" (Leo Kottke, Ron Nagle) – 4:56
 "Pamela Brown" (Tom T. Hall) – 4:02
 "Standing on the Outside" (Leo Kottke, Mary Kottke) – 2:29
 "Power Failure" (Gary Brooker, Keith Reid) – 2:20

Personnel
Leo Kottke - 6 & 12-string guitar, vocals
Bill Barber - piano
Bill Berg - drums
Kenny Buttrey - drums
Roy Estrada - bass
Kim Fowley - vocals
Cal Hand - pedal steel guitar
Paul Lagos - drums
Wayne Moss - bass
Larry Taylor - bass

References

External links
The Best liner notes
Leo Kottke's official site
Unofficial Leo Kottke web site (fan site)
The Capitol Years

1976 greatest hits albums
Albums produced by Denny Bruce
Leo Kottke compilation albums
Capitol Records compilation albums